Johan Brunström and Frederik Nielsen were the defending champions but chose not to defend their title.

Brian Baker and Mackenzie McDonald won the title after defeating Sekou Bangoura and Eric Quigley 6–3, 6–4 in the final.

Seeds

Draw

References
 Main Draw
 Qualifying Draw

Fairfield Challenger - Doubles
Fairfield Challenger